Abu Qatada may refer to:

 Abu Qatada al-Ansari (584–658/660), knight of the Rashidun Caliphate
 Abu Qatada al-Filistini (born 1959), Palestinian Islamic cleric